Loreto Convent Msongari is an all-girls school in Nairobi’s Lavington area. It was founded by the Sisters of Loreto with Catholic traditions in 1921.

The school teaches two curriculums: the Kenyan 8-4-4 (in primary and high school) and the British IGCSE (high school only) curriculums. The high school has boarding and day facilities while the primary school has day schooling only.

References

.

External links
 Official School website link

Catholic secondary schools in Kenya
Schools in Nairobi
Msongari
Catholic primary schools in Kenya
1921 establishments in Kenya
Educational institutions established in 1921